Carasi, officially the Municipality of Carasi, is a 5th class municipality in the province of Ilocos Norte, Philippines. According to the 2020 census, it has a population of 1,607 people.

Geography 
Carasi is a land-locked town situated in the eastern border of Ilocos Norte. It has an area of 157.48 km2. Vintar is situated in the north of Carasi, Calanasan in the east, Nueva Era in the south and Piddig in the west. It is in the foot of the Cordillera Mountains.

Barangays
Carasi is politically subdivided into 3 barangays. These barangays are headed by elected officials: Barangay Captain, Barangay Council, whose members are called Barangay Councilors. All are elected every three years.
 Angset
 Barbaqueso (Poblacion)
 Virbira

Climate

Demographics

Economy

Government 
Carasi, belonging to the first congressional district of the province of Ilocos Norte, is governed by a mayor designated as its local chief executive and by a municipal council as its legislative body in accordance with the Local Government Code. The mayor, vice mayor, and the councilors are elected directly by the people through an election which is being held every three years.

Elected officials

Municipal seal 
Shield, denotes that Carasi is within the Province of Ilocos Norte
Deer, represents hunting as means of livelihood of the townspeople
Pine Tree, stands for the forest products that abound in the town
Center Design, signifies defense and protection (shield); hardwork (bolo); and patriotism and bravery (spear).

References

External links
[ Philippine Standard Geographic Code]
Philippine Census Information
Local Governance Performance Management System

Municipalities of Ilocos Norte